"Oranges and Lemons" is a traditional English nursery rhyme, folksong, and singing game which refers to the bells of several churches, all within or close to the City of London. It is listed in the Roud Folk Song Index as No 13190.  The earliest known printed version appeared c. 1744.

Lyrics
 

Oranges and lemons,
Say the bells of St. Clement's.

You owe me five farthings,
Say the bells of St. Martin's.

When will you pay me?
Say the bells at Old Bailey.

When I grow rich,
Say the bells at Shoreditch.

When will that be?
Say the bells of Stepney.

I do not know,
Says the great bell at Bow.

Here comes a candle to light you to bed,
And here comes a chopper to chop off your head!
  Chip chop chip chop the last man is dead

Alternative versions
Gay go up, and gay go down,
To ring the bells of London town.

Bull's eyes and targets,
Say the bells of St. Margaret's.

Brickbats and tiles,
Say the bells of St. Giles'.

Halfpence and farthings,
Say the bells of St. Martin's.

Oranges and lemons,
Say the bells of St. Clement's.

Pancakes and fritters,
Say the bells of St. Peter's.

Two sticks and an apple,
Say the bells at Whitechapel.

Pokers and tongs,
Say the bells at St. John's.

Kettles and pans,
Say the bells at St. Ann's.

Old Father Baldpate,
Say the slow bells at Aldgate.

Maids in white Aprons
Say the bells of St Catherine's.

You owe me ten shillings,
Say the bells of St. Helen's.

When will you pay me?
Say the bells at Old Bailey.

When I grow rich,
Say the bells at Shoreditch.

Pray when will that be?
Say the bells of Stepney.

I'm sure I don't know,
Says the great bell at Bow.

Here comes a candle to light you to bed,
And here comes a chopper to chop off your head.

As a game

The song is used in a children's singing game with the same name, in which the players file, in pairs, through an arch made by two of the players (made by having the players face each other, raise their arms over their head, and clasp their partners' hands). The challenge comes during the final lines beginning "Here comes a chopper to chop off your head"; and on the final repetition of "chop" in the last line, the children forming the arch drop their arms to catch the pair of children currently passing through. These are then "out" and must form another arch next to the existing one. In this way, the series of arches becomes a steadily lengthening tunnel through which each set of two players has to run faster and faster to escape in time.

Alternative versions of the game include: children caught "out" by the last rhyme may stand behind one of the children forming the original arch, instead of forming additional arches; and children forming "arches" may bring their hands down for each word of the last line, while the children passing through the arches run as fast as they can to avoid being caught on the last word.

Origins and meaning

Various theories have been advanced to account for the rhyme, including: that it deals with child sacrifice; that it describes public executions; that it describes Henry VIII's marital difficulties. Problematically for these theories the last two lines, with their different metre, do not appear in the earlier recorded versions of the rhyme, including the first printed in Tommy Thumb's Pretty Song Book (c. 1744), where the lyrics are:

Two Sticks and Apple,
Ring ye Bells at Whitechapple,
Old Father Bald Pate,
Ring ye Bells Aldgate,
Maids in White Aprons,
Ring ye Bells a St. Catherines,
Oranges and Lemons,
Ring ye bells at St. Clements,
When will you pay me,
Ring ye Bells at ye Old Bailey,
When I am Rich,
Ring ye Bells at Fleetditch,
When will that be,
Ring ye Bells at Stepney,
When I am Old,
Ring ye Bells at Pauls.

There is considerable variation in the churches and lines attached to them in versions printed in the late eighteenth and early nineteenth centuries, which makes any overall meaning difficult to establish. The final two lines of the modern version were first collected by James Orchard Halliwell in the 1840s.

"Oranges and Lemons" was the title of a square dance, published from the third (1657) edition onwards of The Dancing Master. Similar rhymes naming churches and giving rhymes to their names can be found in other parts of England, including Shropshire and Derby, where they were sung on festival days on which bells would also have been rung.

The identity of the London churches is not always clear, but the following have been suggested, along with some factors that may have influenced the accompanying statements:
St. Clement's may be St Clement Danes or St Clement Eastcheap, both of which are near the wharves where merchantmen landed citrus fruits.
St. Martin's may be St Martin Orgar in the City, or St. Martin-in-the-Fields near Trafalgar Square.
St Sepulchre-without-Newgate (opposite the Old Bailey) is near the Fleet Prison where debtors were held.
St Leonard's, Shoreditch is just outside the old City walls.
St Dunstan's, Stepney is also outside the City walls.
Bow is St Mary-le-Bow in Cheapside.
St. Helen's, in the longer version of the song, is St Helen's Bishopsgate, in the City.
"Whitechapple" may refer to St Mary Matfelon, Whitechapel, or to the Whitechapel Bell Foundry which began making bells in 1570. "Two sticks and an apple" may refer to handbells.
St. Catherine's is most likely St Katharine Cree, Aldgate. "Maids in white aprons" could be local market-sellers.
St. Margaret's is St Margaret Lothbury.
St. Giles' is St Giles in the Fields.
St. Peter's is St Peter upon Cornhill. "Pancakes and fritters" may refer to foods sold nearby, as it was a grain market.
"Fleetditch" is St Pancras Old Church, located near the River Fleet.
St. John's is St John's Chapel in the Tower of London; "pokers and tongs" may allude to instruments of torture used on prisoners. It could also be St John Clerkenwell.
St. Anne's is St Anne and St Agnes near the Barbican. "Kettles and pans" may refer to nearby coppersmiths.
"Aldgate" is St Botolph's Aldgate, while "old father baldpate" refers to the monk Saint Botolph. It may also be an allusion to the glans penis, as St Botolph's was notorious for being a meeting-place for prostitutes.

Melody

The tune is reminiscent of change ringing, and the intonation of each line is said to correspond with the distinct sounds of each church's bells. Today, the bells of St Clement Danes ring out the tune of the rhyme—as reported in 1940 the church's playing of the tune was interrupted during World War II due to Nazi bombing of the church during the Blitz. As is the case with almost all traditional songs, there were minor variations in the melody. Collector of British folk songs, James Madison Carpenter, recorded two versions of the song in the 1930s which are now available on the Vaughan Williams Memorial Library website: one in Garsington, Oxfordshire and another somewhere in either Yorkshire or Lincolnshire. These recordings show slight melodic and lyrical variations.

Song settings

A setting of the full Tommy Thumb's Pretty Song Book version for choir was written by Bob Chilcott. Entitled "London Bells", it is the third movement of "Songs and Cries of London Town" (2001).

Benjamin Till composed music based upon the nursery rhyme which was performed in 2009 at St Mary-le-Bow, London to honour 150 years of the great bell, Big Ben.

In popular culture
The nursery rhyme appears several times in the novel Nineteen Eighty-Four by George Orwell.  It appears in the Roald Dahl short story "A Piece of Cake," which is included in his collection The Wonderful Story of Henry Sugar and Six More. The song and its associated game feature in the 1970 British horror comedy, Mumsy, Nanny, Sonny and Girly, as well as the novella by its screenwriter, Brian Comport. It also appears in the book Private Peaceful by Michael Morpurgo and its 2012 film adaption, frequently sung by the character Big Joe. The rhyme, featured in the 2017 supernatural horror film It, was also featured in the piano music that opens and closes the film.

The phrase Here Comes a Candle was used by Fredric Brown as the title of one of his novels. A character in Neil Gaiman's The Sandman, writer Erasmus Fry, likewise titles one of his novels Here Comes a Candle. The album Oranges & Lemons by XTC takes its name from the nursery rhyme.

See also
"Dong, Dong, Dongdaemun", Korean nursery rhyme for playing a similar game to "Oranges and Lemons"
"London Bridge Is Falling Down", another English nursery rhyme for playing a similar game to "Oranges and Lemons"
"The Bells of Rhymney", a similar song about church bells, although in Wales as opposed to London and also telling the story of labor disputes in the mining industry

References

External links

 BBC School Radio online - Nursery Songs. "Oranges and Lemons" (with animation and lyrics)
 The British Library Sound and Moving Images Catalogue - List Recording 1CD0323981 on Audio CD : Oranges & lemons. Tunes from the collection 'The Dancing Master' (includes notes by Annegret Fischer, and song texts)
 Map of the likely church locations

English folklore
Singing games
Songs about London
English nursery rhymes
English children's songs
English folk songs
Traditional children's songs